WBHT (97.1 MHz) and WBHD (95.7 MHz) are co-owned commercial FM radio stations serving the Wilkes Barre - Scranton - Hazleton area of Northeastern Pennsylvania.  The two stations simulcast a Top 40 (CHR) radio format and are owned by Cumulus Media.  They use the moniker "Hot 97.1 and 95.7."  The stations carry the syndicated wake up program, "The Bert Show," from co-owned WWWQ in Atlanta.

WBHT is licensed to Mountain Top, Pennsylvania, and has an effective radiated power (ERP) of 500 watts.  WBHD is licensed to Olyphant, Pennsylvania, and has an ERP of 600 watts.  Both stations have their transmitters on 1000 foot tall mountains, so their signals can be heard around much of Northeastern Pennsylvania.

Notable alumni
 Kid Kelly programmed the station in the mid 1990s when it was called Hot 97. He then returned to WHTZ New York in a programming capacity before moving over to Sirius Satellite Radio.  He is now the Vice President of Pop, Dance, & Urban Music at Sirius XM Radio. He can still be heard on 'BHT' with his national radio show "BackTrax USA 90's" on Sunday mornings from 8AM to 10AM.
 Dead Air Dave was called A.B. Love on Hot 97 in the late 1990s. He went on to crosstown WKRZ and then 105.1 The Buzz/Big 105 New York City before landing on the air at WXRK and later adding dump button duties for The Howard Stern Show. He's now the afternoon drive host on WWFS Fresh 102.7 New York City using the name Dylan.
 Billy Hammond was the "Purple-Headed Love Freak" night guy at Hot 97 in the late 1990s. He later did nights at WIOQ Philadelphia and WHTZ New York. He later did nights on WKSC-FM Chicago.
 Nikki was the late-night Hot 97 jock in the late 1990s. She has since been on the radio in Las Vegas, Miami, and Chicago's WKSC-FM before jumping to crosstown WBBM B96.
 Kelly K was on the Hot 97 morning show in the late 1990s before doing radio in Boston. She returned to NEPA as music director and personality on WKRZ.
 Jenn Starr co-hosted the "Jenn & AJ Morning Show" until 2007.  She is now the Marketing Manager for Racing at Mohegan Sun at Pocono Downs Casino & Racetrack.  AJ became the afternoon personality and Programming Director after Jenn left.
 AJ co-hosted the "Jenn & AJ Morning Show" until 2007.  AJ became the afternoon personality and Programming Director after Jenn left. He left 97BHT after 12 years at the end of March 2012.  He is now the Programming Director at WWHT Hot 107.9 in Syracuse, NY.
 Steve Romanko was the original overnight personality, using the moniker "Steve Foxx", The Foxx that rocks your box.  He moved to San Francisco in 1994, doing a brief stint at KFOG and then working for Skywalker Sound from 1997 to 2002.  Romanko has been an independent filmmaker since 2002 and owns 13th Generation Productions.
  Marc Anthony Original jock on the air at Hot 97 in April 1993. Hosted the Marc and Renee Show from 93–96 with Renee Loftus, wife of General Manager Jim Loftus. Marc was the host of the Marc and Vicki show at Z104 in Madison, Wisconsin from 1996–2001. He then moved to Star 102.1 WWST in 2001 where he is currently the host of the Marc & Kim and Frank show with Kim Hansard and Frank Murphy.

References

External links
 

BHT
Contemporary hit radio stations in the United States
Cumulus Media radio stations
Radio stations established in 1994
1994 establishments in Pennsylvania